Greta Scarano (born 27 August 1986) is an Italian television, stage and film actress.

Early life
Scarano was born in Rome, Italy.

Career 
Scarano made her professional debut in the TV-series R.I.S. - Delitti imperfetti. Between 2008 and 2009, she played Sabrina Guarini in the Rai 3 soap opera Un Posto al Sole, and between 2012 and 2015, she played the Inspector Francesca Leoni in the Canale 5 crime series Squadra antimafia – Palermo oggi.

For her performance in the film Without Pity, in 2015 Scarano won the Guglielmo Biraghi Award at the 70th Silver Ribbon Awards. In 2016 she was awarded the Nastro d'Argento for Best Supporting Actress and the Ciak d'oro as discovery of the year for  Stefano Sollima's Suburra.

References

External links  
 
 

1986 births
Living people 
Actresses from Rome
Italian film actresses 
Italian stage actresses 
Italian television actresses
21st-century Italian actresses
Nastro d'Argento winners